Herman Rarebell (born 18 November 1949 as Hermann Josef Erbel) is a German musician, best known as the drummer for the hard rock band Scorpions from 1977 to 1995, during which time he played on eight studio albums. Aside from playing drums, Rarebell wrote or co-wrote several songs for the group such as "Another Piece of Meat", "Falling in Love" and "Passion Rules the Game". He composed the lyrics for some of the band's most well known songs such as "Rock You Like a Hurricane", "Make It Real", "Dynamite", "Blackout", "Arizona", "Bad Boys Running Wild", "Don't Stop at the Top", and "Tease Me Please Me".

Herman Rarebell received his education in the subjects drums and piano at the Musikhochschule Saarbrücken. Rarebell played drums from 1965 with the band The Mastermen, from 1968 with The Fuggs Blues and RS Rindfleisch, with whom he released one single and performed in the clubs of the US military throughout Germany. In 1972–73 he played on three albums by the Krautrock band Missus Beastly, with a line-up consisting of three RS Rindfleisch members with a new singer and two additional musicians. The following year he joined the band Onyx after the name change to Vineyard. During his time in Scorpions, Rarebell released two solo albums Nip in the Bud (1981) and Herman Ze German (1986).

Setup 
Rarebell has been a long-time user of Ludwig drums and Paiste cymbals, which he used for his entire duration with Scorpions, though he would occasionally alter the amount of drums and cymbals he would have on his setup.

Discography 
Missus Beastly

1972 – Volksmusik
 1973 – Spinatwachtel
1973 – Weramean · Missus Beastly (split) – Super Rock Made In Germany / Im Garten Des Schweigens

Scorpions:

1977 – Taken By Force
 1978 – Tokyo Tapes
 1979 – Lovedrive
 1980 – Animal Magnetism
 1982 – Blackout
 1984 – Love At First Sting
 1985 – World Wide Live
 1988 – Savage Amusement
 1990 – Crazy World
 1993 – Face The Heat
 1995 – Live Bites

Solo:

 1981 – Nip in the Bud
 1986 – Herman Ze German
 1986 – Herman Ze German And Friends (Single) Wipe Out b/w Pancake
 2005 – Drum Legends(Rarebell/York/Antolini)
 2007 – I'm Back (released in Germany, not distributed in the US)
 2008 – My Life as a Scorpion
 2008 – Herman's Collection (Best of solos)
 2010 – Herman Ze German + My life as a Scorpion Box set
 2010 – HZG- "Top of the Rock" (Single) 
 2010 – Take It As It Comes (US version of "I'm Back") 
 2013 – Acoustic Fever
 2020 – Thomas Tomsen – "No Return To Earth"

References

External links 
 Official website
 HardRadio.com interview with Herman Rarebell
 MetalExpressRadio.com interview with Herman Rarebell

1949 births
Living people
Scorpions (band) members
German heavy metal drummers
German rock drummers
Male drummers
German male musicians
Michael Schenker Group members
Glam metal musicians